Susan Segal is an American lawyer from Minnesota who is the Chief Judge of the Minnesota Court of Appeals. She previously served as the Minneapolis City Attorney

Education 

Segal earned her Bachelor of Arts from the University of California, Berkeley and her Juris Doctor, cum laude, from the University of Michigan Law School.

Legal career 

Segal established her own law firm, Susan Segal PLLC, focused on employment law. She was also a partner at Gray, Plant, Mooty, Mooty & Bennett, P.A. and a Senior Attorney at the Hennepin County Attorney's Office. Prior to her appointment to the court, she was first nominated to the position by Mayor R.T. Rybak as the Minneapolis City Attorney in early 2008. In her role, she was responsible for the legal work of the city, including all litigation involving the city and its boards and commissions, and managing an office of 110 employees.

Minnesota Court of  Appeals service 

On October 9, 2019, Governor Tim Walz announced the appointment of Segal to be a Judge of the Minnesota Court of Appeals. She assumed office on November 26, 2019, she filled the vacancy left by Jill Flaskamp Halbrooks. On April 13, 2020, Governor Walz named Segal as Chief Judge of the Court of Appeals.

Community activities 

Segal's community involvement includes service as the chair of the board of trustees of the Women's Foundation of Minnesota and board member of Minnesota Film and TV; she was previously the chair of board of the Mental Health Association of Minnesota.

Personal life 

Segal is Jewish.

References

External links 

1960s births
Living people
20th-century American lawyers
20th-century American women lawyers
21st-century American judges
21st-century American women judges
Lawyers from Minneapolis
Minnesota Court of Appeals judges
University of California, Berkeley alumni
University of Michigan Law School alumni